Victimology is the study of victimization, including the psychological effects on victims, the relationship between victims and offenders, the interactions between victims and the criminal justice system—that is, the police and courts, and corrections officials—and the connections between victims and other social groups and institutions, such as the media, businesses, and social movements.

Victim of a crime 
In criminology and criminal law, a victim of a crime is an identifiable person who has been harmed individually and directly by the perpetrator, rather than by society as a whole. However, this may not always be the case, as with victims of white collar crime, who may not be clearly identifiable or directly linked to crime against a particular individual. Victims of white collar crime are often denied their status as victims by the social construction of the concept (Croall, 2001). The concept also remains a controversial topic within women's studies.

The Supreme Court of the United States first recognized the rights of crime victims to make a victim impact statement during the sentencing phase of a criminal trial in the case of Payne v. Tennessee .

A victim impact panel, which usually follows the victim impact statement, is a form of community-based or restorative justice in which the crime victims (or relatives and friends of deceased crime victims) meet with the defendant after conviction to tell the convict about how the criminal activity affected them, in the hope of rehabilitation or deterrence.

Consequences of crimes 
Emotional distress as the result of crime is a recurring theme for all victims of crime.  The most common problems, affecting three quarters of victims, were psychological problems, including: fear, anxiety, nervousness, self-blame, anger, shame, and difficulty sleeping. These problems often result in the development of chronic post-traumatic stress disorder (PTSD). Post crime distress is also linked to pre-existing emotional problems and sociodemographic variables.  This has been known to become a leading case of the elderly to be more adversely affected.(Ferraro, 1995)

Victims may experience the following psychological reactions:
 Increase in the realization of personal vulnerability.
 The perception of the world as meaningless and incomprehensible.
 The view of themselves in a negative light.

The experience of victimization may result in increasing fear on the part of the victim, and the spread of fear in the community.

Victim proneness

Environmental theory 
The environmental theory posits that the location and context of the crime bring the victim of the crime and its perpetrator together.

Studies in the early 2010s showed that crimes are negatively correlated to trees in urban environments; more trees in an area are congruent with lower victimization rates or violent crime rates.  This relationship was established by studies in 2010 in Portland, Oregon and in 2012 in Baltimore, Maryland. Geoffrey Donovan of the United States Forest Service (USFS), one of the researchers, said, "trees, which provide a range of other benefits, could improve quality of life in Portland by reducing crime..." because "We believe that large street trees can reduce crime by signaling to a potential criminal that a neighborhood is better cared for and, therefore, a criminal is more likely to be caught."  Note that the presence of large street trees especially indicated a reduction in crime, as opposed to newer, smaller trees. In the 2012 Baltimore study, led by scientists from the University of Vermont and the United States Department of Agriculture (USDA), a "conservative spatially adjusted model indicated that a 10% increase in tree canopy was associated with a roughly 12% decrease in crime.... [and] we found that the inverse relationship continued in both contexts, but the magnitude was 40% greater for public than for private lands."

Quantification of victim-proneness 
There have been some studies recently to quantify the real existence of victim-proneness. Contrary to the popular belief that more women are repeat victims, and thus more victim-prone than men, actually men in their prime (24- to 34-year-old males) are more likely to be victims of repeated crimes.

In the case of juvenile offenders, the study results also show that people are more likely to be victimized as a result of a serious offense by someone they know; the most frequent crimes committed by adolescents towards someone they know were sexual assault, common assault, and homicide.  Adolescents victimizing people they did not know generally committed common assault, forcible confinement, and armed or unarmed robbery.

Sex workers are, anecdotally, thought to have an abnormally high incidence of violent crime committed against them, and such crimes go frequently unresolved, but there are few victimological studies of the matter.

Fundamental attribution error 

In social psychology, the fundamental attribution error (also known as correspondence bias or attribution effect) describes the tendency to over-value dispositional or personality-based explanations for the observed behaviors of others while under-valuing situational explanations for those behaviors. The term was coined by Lee Ross some years after a now-classic experiment by Edward E. Jones and Victor Harris (1967).

The fundamental attribution error is most visible when people explain the behavior of others. It does not explain interpretations of one's own behavior—where situational factors are often taken into consideration. This discrepancy is called the actor–observer bias.  As a simple example, if Alice saw Bob trip over a rock and fall, Alice might consider Bob to be clumsy or careless (dispositional). If Alice later tripped over the same rock herself, she would be more likely to blame the placement of the rock (situational).  Victim proneness or victim blaming can be a form of fundamental attribution error, and more specifically, the just-world phenomenon(Aronson, Wilson, Akert, & Sommers, 2016, p. 107).

The Just-world phenomenon is the belief that people get what they deserve and deserve what they get, which was first theorized by Melvin Lerner (1977). Attributing failures to dispositional causes rather than situational causes, which are unchangeable and uncontrollable, satisfies our need to believe that the world is fair and we have control over our life. We are motivated to see a just world because this reduces our perceived threats, gives us a sense of security, helps us find meaning in difficult and unsettling circumstances, and benefits us psychologically. Unfortunately, the just-world hypothesis also results in a tendency for people to blame and disparage victims of a tragedy or an accident, such as victims of rape and domestic abuse to reassure themselves of their insusceptibility to such events. People may even blame the victim's faults in "past lives" to pursue justification for their bad outcome.

Victim facilitation 

Victim facilitation, another controversial sub-topic, but a more accepted theory than victim proneness, finds its roots in the writings of criminologists such as Marvin Wolfgang. The choice to use victim facilitation as opposed to "victim proneness" or some other term is that victim facilitation is not blaming the victim, but rather the interactions of the victim that make them vulnerable to a crime.

The theory of victim facilitation calls for study of the external elements that make a victim more accessible or vulnerable to an attack. In an article that summarizes the major movements in victimology internationally, Schneider expresses victim facilitation as a model that ultimately describes only the misinterpretation by the offender of victim behavior. It is based upon the theory of a symbolic interaction and does not alleviate the offender of their exclusive responsibility.

In Eric Hickey's Serial Murderers and their Victims, a major analysis of 329 serial killers in America is conducted. As part of Hickey's analysis, he categorized victims as high, low, or mixed regarding the victim's facilitation of the murder. Categorization was based upon lifestyle risk (example, amount of time spent interacting with strangers), type of employment, and their location at the time of the killing (example, bar, home or place of business).  Hickey found that 13–15% of victims had high facilitation, 60–64% of victims had low facilitation and 23–25% of victims had a combination of high and low facilitation. Hickey also noted that among serial killer victims after 1975, one in five victims were at greater risk from hitchhiking, working as a prostitute, or involving themselves in situations in which they often came into contact with strangers.

There is importance in studying and understanding victim facilitation as well as continuing to research it as a sub-topic of victimization. For instance, a study of victim facilitation increases public awareness, leads to more research on victim-offender relationship, and advances theoretical etiologies of violent crime.  One of the ultimate purposes of this type of knowledge is to inform the public and increase awareness so fewer people become victims. Another goal of studying victim facilitation, as stated by Maurice Godwin, is to aid in investigations. Godwin discusses the theory of victim social networks as a concept in which one looks at the areas of highest risk for victimization from a serial killer. This can be connected to victim facilitation because the victim social networks are the locations in which the victim is most vulnerable to the serial killer. Using this process, investigators can create a profile of places where the serial killer and victim both frequent.

Victimization rate in United States 
The National Crime Victimization Survey (NCVS) is a tool to measure the existence of actual, rather than reported, crimes—the victimization rate.  The National Crime Victimization Survey is the United States' "primary source of information on crime victimization.  Each year, data is obtained from a nationally representative sample of 77,200 households comprising nearly 134,000 persons on the frequency, characteristics and consequences of criminal victimization in the United States.  This survey enables the (government) to estimate the likelihood of victimization for  rape, sexual assault, robbery, assault, theft, household burglary, and motor vehicle theft for the population as a whole as well as for segments of the population such as women, the elderly, members of various racial groups, city dwellers, or other groups." According to the Bureau of Justice Statistics (BJS), the NCVS reveals that, from 1994 to 2005, violent crime rates declined, reaching the lowest levels ever recorded. Property crimes continue to decline.

Serial killings are waning in particular, and according to a 2020 ABA Journal report, it's in large part because "people are less vulnerable than in the past." This in turn is due to several societal changes, according to experts and a news reports cited by the ABA Journal: (1) “People don't hitchhike anymore;" (2) “They have means of reaching out in an emergency situation using cellphones;" (3) "There are cameras everywhere;” (4) "parents today are less likely to allow [children] to leave home unsupervised;" (5) "interventions that help troubled children might reform potential killers" (for example, social work, school nurses, and child psychology); (6) "easy access to pornography is providing an outlet that satiates ... sexual impulses"; and (7) "would-be serial killers are turning instead to mass shootings." Other reports show some evidence that serial killings are (8) deterred generally by "longer prison sentences" and (9) deterred specifically by "a reduction in parole."

Victimization  in Canada 
In Canada the Office of the Federal Ombudsman for Victims of Crime (OFOVC) is an independent resource for victims of crime.  It was created in 2007 to ensure the federal government meets its responsibilities to victims of crime. The ombudsman provides information to victims  about their rights under Canadian federal law, the services available to them, or to make a complaint about any federal agency or federal legislation dealing with victims of crime. The ombudsman  also works to ensure that policy makers and other criminal justice personnel are aware of victims' needs and concerns and to identify important issues and trends that may negatively impact victims. Where appropriate, the Ombudsman may also make recommendations to the federal government.

International Crime Victims Survey 
Many countries have such victimization surveys. They give a much better account for the volume crimes but are less accurate for crimes that occur with a (relative) low frequency such as homicide, or victimless 'crimes' such as drug (ab)use. Attempts to use the data from these national surveys for international comparison have failed. Differences in definitions of crime and other methodological differences are too big for proper comparison.

A dedicated survey for international comparison: A group of European criminologists started an international victimization study with the sole purpose to generate international comparative crime and victimization data. The project is now known as the International Crime Victims Survey (ICVS). After the first round in 1989, the surveys were repeated in 1992, 1996, and 2000 and 2004/2005.

Society as crime victim 
One train of thought supposes society itself is the victim of many crimes, especially such felonies as murder, homicide and manslaughter.  Many lawyers, judges, and academics have espoused this sentiment.

Penal couple 
The penal couple is defined as the relationship between perpetrator and victim of a crime. That is, both are involved in the event.  A sociologist invented the term in 1963.  The term is now accepted by many sociologists.  The concept is, essentially, that "when a crime takes place, it has two partners, one the offender and second the victim, who is providing opportunity to the criminal in committing the crime."  The victim, in this view, is "a participant in the penal couple and should bear some 'functional responsibility' for the crime."  The very idea is rejected by some other victimologists as  blaming the victim.

Rights of victims 

In 1985, the  UN General Assembly adopted the Declaration on the Basic Principles of Justice for Victims of Crime and Abuse of Power. Also, the International Victimology Institute Tilburg (INTERVICT) and the World Society of Victimology developed a UN Convention for Victims of Crime and Abuse of Power.

The term victimology, in fact, denotes to the subject, which studies about the harm(s) caused to victims in commission of crime and the relative scope for compensation to the victim as a means of redressal. In criminal jurisprudence, mere punishiment of an offender is not considered sufficient in redressing the grievance of victim; there is need to compensate the loss or harms suffered by the victim. In Criminal Procedure Code, though provisions have been made in Section 357 to provide compensation to victims, who have suffered loss or harms in consequence to commission of offence. But, what has been provided in Indian Law, as a compensatory measure to victims of crimes, is not enough and this aspect needs to be reviewed by the legislature to frame or enact necessary law, so as to sufficiently compensate to victims of crimes and to provide safeguards to victims of crimes, besides compensating him in monetary terms. [S.P. Sharma, Advocate, Rajasthan High Court, Jodhpur, December, 2010].

See also

References

Further reading 
 Acker, James R., and Karp, Daniel R., Wounds that Do Not Bind: Victim-based Perspectives on the Death Penalty, Carolina Academic Press, 2006
 Croall, H. (2001) Understanding White Collar Crime (Open University Press). Croall, H. (2001) "The Victims of White Collar Crime," in Lindgren, S. (ed) White Collar Crime Research. Old Views and Future Potentials, National Council for Crime Prevention, Sweden. Both noted at Glasgow Caledonian University website page for Hazel Croall, Professor of Criminology, School of Law & Social Sciences
 Lisak, David, "Understanding the Predatory Nature of Sexual Violence," 12 pages, n.d., at Middlebury College website
 Ruhs, Florian: "Foreign Workers in the Second World War. The Ordeal of Slovenians in Germany", in: aventinus nova Nr. 32 [29.05.2011]

External links 
 World Society of Victimology
 International Victimology Website
 Tokiwa International Victimology Institute
 TIVI Bibliography of Victimology
 International Victimology Institute Tilburg (INTERVICT)
 American Society of Victimology 
 South Asian Society of Criminology and Victimology
 Centre for Cyber Victim Counselling
 Victims Network: British Society of Criminology

 
Interdisciplinary subfields of sociology
Victims' rights
Social psychology
Criminology
Sociology of law